Tipranavir (TPV), or tipranavir disodium, is a nonpeptidic protease inhibitor (PI) manufactured by Boehringer Ingelheim under the trade name Aptivus  . It is administered with ritonavir in combination therapy to treat HIV infection.

Tipranavir has the ability to inhibit the replication of viruses that are resistant to other protease inhibitors and is recommended for patients who are resistant to other treatments. Resistance to tipranavir itself seems to require multiple mutations. Tipranavir was approved by the Food and Drug Administration (FDA) on June 22, 2005, and was approved for pediatric use on June 24, 2008.

Tipranavir should only be taken in combination with ritonavir and other antiretroviral drugs, and is not approved for treatment-naïve patients. Like lopinavir and atazanavir, it is very potent and is effective in salvage therapy for patients with drug resistance. However, side effects of tipranavir may be more severe than those of other antiretrovirals. Some side effects include intracranial hemorrhage, hepatitis, hepatic decompensation, hyperglycemia and diabetes mellitus. The drug has also been shown to cause increases in total cholesterol and triglycerides.

Aptivus labeling has a black box warning regarding hepatotoxicity and intracranial hemorrhage.

References

External links 
 

4-Pyrones
Boehringer Ingelheim
CYP2D6 inhibitors
Dihydropyrans
Hepatotoxins
HIV protease inhibitors
Trifluoromethyl compounds
Pyridines
Sulfonamides